The Prose Tristan (Tristan en prose) is an adaptation of the Tristan and Iseult story into a long prose romance, and the first to tie the subject entirely into the arc of the Arthurian legend. It was also the first major Arthurian prose cycle commenced after the widely popular Lancelot-Grail (Vulgate Cycle), which influenced especially the later portions of the Prose Tristan.

Authorship and dating 
According to the prologue, the first part of the book (i.e. everything before the Grail material) is attributed to the otherwise unknown Luce de Gat, and was probably begun between 1230 and 1235. The work was expanded and reworked sometime after 1240 to create the more popular version known as V2. In the epilogue of V2, its author names himself as "Helie de Boron", asserting that he is the nephew of the first author of the Arthurian Grail cycles, poet Robert de Boron. Helie de Boron claims, like the so-called authors of the Roman de la Rose, to have picked up the story where Luce left off. Neither the biographies of the two authors, nor the claim that they had been translating the work from a Latin original are taken seriously by scholars.

Synopsis
The first part of the work stays closer to the traditional story as told by verse writers like Béroul and Thomas of Britain, but many episodes are reworked or altered entirely. Tristan's parents are given new names and backstories, and the overall tone has been called "more realistic" than the verse material though there are moments where characters sing. Tristan's guardian Governal takes him to France, where he grows up at the court of King Pharamond. He later arrives at the court of his uncle Mark, King of Cornwall, and defends his country against the Irish warrior Morholt. Wounded in the fight, he travels to Ireland where he is healed by Iseult, a renowned doctor and Morholt's niece, but he must flee when the Irish discover he has killed their champion. He later returns, in disguise, to seek Iseult as a bride for his uncle. When they accidentally drink the love potion prepared for Iseult and Mark, they engage in a tragic affair that ends with Tristan being banished to the court of Hoel of Brittany. He eventually marries Hoel's daughter, also named Iseult.

Especially after this point, however, the traditional narrative is continually interrupted for side adventures by the various characters and episodes serving to "Arthurianize" the story. Notably, Tristan's rivalry with the Saracen knight Palamedes is given substantial attention. Additionally, in the long version, Tristan leaves Brittany and returns to his first love, and never sees his wife again, though her brother Kahedin remains his close companion. Tristan is compared frequently to his friend Lancelot in both arms and love, and at times even unknowingly engages him in battles. He becomes a Knight of the Round Table (taking Morholt's old seat) and embarks on the Quest for the Holy Grail before abandoning the idea to stay with Iseult at Lancelot's castle. Manuscripts which do not include the Grail material preserve the earlier version of the lovers' deaths, while the longer versions have Mark kill Tristan while he plays the harp for Iseult, only to see her die immediately afterwards.

Legacy
The Prose Tristan had a huge effect on subsequent medieval literature and treatments of the Arthurian legend. Characters like Palamedes, Dinadan, and Lamorak, all of whom first appear in the Tristan, achieved popularity in later works. The pagan knight Palamedes even lent his name to the Romance of Palamedes, a later work that expands on episodes from the Tristan. This material is also preserved in the Compilation of Rustichello da Pisa and numerous later redactions in several languages. The Prose Tristan also influenced the Post-Vulgate Cycle, the next major prose treatment of the Arthurian mythos, and served as the main source for the Tristan section of Thomas Malory's Le Morte d'Arthur.

Scholarship
Before any modern editions of the Prose Tristan were attempted, scholars were dependent on an extended summary and analysis of all the manuscripts by Eilert Löseth in 1890 (republished in 1974). Of the modern editions, the long version is made up of two editions: one edited by Renée L. Curtis and the other by Philippe Ménard. Curtis' edition of a simple manuscript (Carpentras 404) covers Tristan's ancestry and the traditional legend up to Tristan's madness. However, the massive amount of manuscripts in existence dissuaded other scholars from attempting what Curtis had done until Ménard hit upon the idea of using multiple teams of scholars to tackle the infamous Vienna 2542 manuscript. His edition follows from Curtis', includes Tristan's participation in the Quest for the Holy Grail and ends with Tristan and Iseult's death and the first signs of Arthur's fall. The shorter version, which contains no Grail Quest, was published by Joël Blanchard in five volumes.

Though part of the larger prose cycles, which dominated all things Arthurian after the early 13th century, the originality of the Tristan en prose is found in the author's use of lyrical poems to express characters' hopes, despair or anger. Various books and articles have studied the lyrical content of the Prose Tristan whether expressed as riddles in verse, letters in verse, songs of mockery or love songs. In this way, the Prose Tristan functions like a musical. Characters placed in extreme situations actually "break into song." All of this is appropriate considering Tristan's traditional link to poetry.

The Grail Quest has been a source of controversy regarding the Tristan en prose. Instead of writing new material, the author chose to insert (or interpolate) the entire Queste del Saint Graal from the Vulgate Cycle into the Tristan story, thus undermining the sanctity of the Vulgate Queste itself.

Explanatory notes

References
Citations

Bibliography

Curtis, Renée L. (Ed.) (1963–1985). Le Roman de Tristan en prose, vols. 1–3. Cambridge: D.S. Brewer.
 .
Lacy, Norris J. (Ed.) (1991). The New Arthurian Encyclopedia. New York: Garland. .
Ménard, Philippe (Ed.) (1987–1997). Le Roman de Tristan en Prose, vols. 1–9. Geneva: Droz.  

French poems
Epic poems in French
Tristan and Iseult
1230s books
1240s books
Arthurian literature in French
Tristan
Courtly love